KX Andromedae (often abbreviated to KX And) is a spectroscopic binary star in the constellation Andromeda. Its apparent visual magnitude varies between 6.88 and 7.28.

The primary component of the KX Andromedae system is a Be star with a spectral classification B3pe as in 2017, although on historical record it has varied from B1 to B7.

The secondary star is difficult to detect in the spectrum, but has been given a K1III spectral type.  It is likely to be an asymptotic giant branch star that fills its Roche lobe.

The system is only about 25 million years old.

References

Andromeda (constellation)
Andromedae, KX
J23070621+5011324
114154
218393
Be stars
K-type giants
Durchmusterung objects
Spectroscopic binaries